Anhuiphyton lineatum is an extinct species of Neoproterozoic algae, known from several fossils from the Lantian formation of China, first described in 1994. It lived probably more than 580 million years ago. The thalli were of spherical to elliptical shape, made of thousands of flexible septated filaments. The whole organism was a few centimeters in size (from 2.5 to 5 cm at most). Along with Flabellophyton, it is one of the few septated algae found in the assemblage.

See also
 Huangshanophyton

References

Ediacaran life
Fossil algae
Fossil taxa described in 1994